In the Latter Day Saint movement, the Quorum of the Twelve (also known as the Council of the Twelve, the Quorum of the Twelve Apostles, Council of the Twelve Apostles, or the Twelve) is one of the governing bodies or (quorums) of the church hierarchy organized by the movement's founder Joseph Smith and patterned after the Apostles of Jesus (Commissioning of the Twelve Apostles). Members are called Apostles, with a special calling to be evangelistic ambassadors to the world.

The Twelve were designated to be a body of "traveling councillors" with jurisdiction outside areas where the church was formally organized (areas of the world outside of Zion or its outlying Stakes). The Twelve were designated as being equal in authority to the First Presidency, the Seventy, the standing presiding high council, and the High Councils of the various stakes.

After the death of Joseph Smith in 1844, permanent schisms formed in the movement, resulting in the formation of various churches, many of which retained some version of the Quorum of the Twelve.

Members of the Quorum, prior to 1844
In 1835, the Three Witnesses were asked by Smith to select the original twelve members of the church's Quorum of the Twelve. They announced their choices at a meeting on February 14, 1835. The Three Witnesses also ordained the twelve chosen men to the priesthood office of apostle by the laying on of hands, with the ordinations taking place in February through April 1835.

Below is a list of members of the Quorum prior to the succession crisis of 1844 (including those ordained after the original Twelve). A total of 18 different men were members of the Quorum during this period.

In 1838, four members of the Quorum were excommunicated and the President of the Quorum resigned. (President Marsh was-excommunicated in absentia in 1839). Of the five, two of them would later rejoin with Brigham Young and the Church of Jesus Christ of Latter-day Saints (LDS Church) after the 1844 schism, but they would never resume their former places in the Quorum.  Two others would join various sects (with varying degrees as to the acceptance of their apostleship) and never returned to the LDS Church, while the fifth member left the Mormon movement completely.  A sixth member of the Quorum was killed in 1838.

After the 1844 schism, ten of the then-Quorum members followed Young to the Salt Lake Valley. Two others left and joined other sects.

The Church of Jesus Christ of Latter-day Saints (LDS Church)

In the LDS Church, the Quorum of the Twelve is officially referred to as the "Quorum of the Twelve Apostles" or "Council of the Twelve Apostles". The group normally has a leadership role in the church that is second only to the church's First Presidency. The Quorum implicitly follows the First Presidency's policies and pronouncements and its members are chosen by the First Presidency. However, when the First Presidency is dissolved—which occurs upon the death of the President of the Church—the Quorum of the Twelve Apostles becomes the church's governing body (led by the President of the Quorum of the Twelve Apostles) until they ordain a new President of the Church and he chooses counselors, which completes the reorganization of the First Presidency.  Membership in the Quorum of the Twelve is typically a lifetime calling.

Community of Christ

In the Community of Christ, the Council of Twelve Apostles is one of the governing bodies in the church hierarchy. They hold the priesthood office of apostle and are responsible for the evangelistic witness of the church. Apostles are also high priests in the Melchisedec priesthood of the church.

The Church of Jesus Christ (Bickertonite)

The Church of Jesus Christ (Bickertonite) is the third largest denomination that resulted from the 1844 succession crisis.

At a conference in Green Oak, Pennsylvania, in July 1862, leaders of several branches in Pennsylvania, Ohio and Virginia came together and formally organized what they called "The Church of Jesus Christ".  William Bickerton presided over the conference.  Bickerton's two counselors in the newly organized First Presidency were George Barnes and Charles Brown who were ordained apostles. The members of the Quorum of the Twelve at that organization (ordered by seniority) were Arthur Bickerton, Thomas Bickerton, Alexander Bickerton, James Brown, Cummings Cherry, Benjamin Meadowcroft, Joseph Astin, Joseph Knox, William Cadman, James Nichols, John Neish and John Dixon.  At the conference George Barnes reported receiving the "word of the Lord," which he related:

In this church, the "Quorum of Twelve Apostles" are the chief governing officers. Currently, the president of the church and his two counselors are not separated from the quorum, as the total number of apostles in the quorum is twelve, as specified in the scriptures. Apostles (and all ministers—commonly called "elders") in this church are volunteers and are not given any compensation for their ministry.

Church of Christ (Temple Lot)
In the Church of Christ (Temple Lot) the Council of Twelve serves as the head of the church. The church seeks to strictly follow the church organization of the Bible and the Book of Mormon, and teaches that church offices added by Joseph Smith after publication of the Book of Commandments, such as a President of the Church and a First Presidency, were not consistent with the Bible and Book of Mormon, and therefore were not revelations from God .

Remnant Church of Jesus Christ of Latter Day Saints
The Remnant Church of Jesus Christ of Latter Day Saints has an Apostolic Quorum that is, as yet, incomplete by design. As the Remnant Church seeks to be a "renewal" of the Latter Day Saint movement resulting from the 1850s Reorganization, it is attempting to follow similar patterns of that prior reorganization. The First Presidency of the Remnant Church is not drawn from the apostles. Instead, the president of the church is chosen by Jewish Laws of Inheritance.  The current members of the Quorum are: Don Burnett (President of the Quorum), Robert Murie Jr., Terry W. Patience, Roger Tracy, and Mark Deitrick.

Notes

References
.

.
.
.

Further reading

Church of Christ (Latter Day Saints)
Types of Latter Day Saint organization
Latter Day Saint leaders
1835 establishments in the United States

de:Kollegium der Zwölf Apostel
fi:Kahdentoista apostolin koorum